Stinnes is a surname. Notable people with the surname include:

Clärenore Stinnes (1901–1990), German racing driver
Hugo Stinnes (1870–1924), German entrepreneur and politician, father of Clärenore
Matiás Stinnes (1910–?), Argentine luger